Abdelkarim Ben Zahra (born 27 October 1998) is a Moroccan track and field athlete who specializes in the 3000 metres steeplechase. In 2021, he competed in the men's 3000 metres steeplechase event at the 2020 Summer Olympics held in Tokyo, Japan.

In 2017, he competed in the junior men's race at the 2017 IAAF World Cross Country Championships held in Kampala, Uganda.

In 2019, he competed in the men's 3000 metres steeplechase at the 2019 World Athletics Championships held in Doha, Qatar. He did not qualify to compete in the final.

In the same year, he represented Morocco at the 2019 African Games held in Rabat, Morocco. He competed in the men's 3000 metres steeplechase and he did not finish his race.

References

External links 

 
 
 
 

Living people
1998 births
Place of birth missing (living people)
Moroccan male cross country runners
Moroccan male steeplechase runners
World Athletics Championships athletes for Morocco
Athletes (track and field) at the 2019 African Games
African Games competitors for Morocco
Athletes (track and field) at the 2020 Summer Olympics
Olympic athletes of Morocco
20th-century Moroccan people
21st-century Moroccan people